Malika Benhabylès is a retired Algerian runner. She won the bronze medal in the 3000 metres at the 1987 Arab Championships and in the 10,000 metres at the 1988 African Championships. She became Algerian champion in both events.

References

Year of birth missing (living people)
Living people
Algerian female long-distance runners
21st-century Algerian people